

Meta

Metab-metam 

 Metabromsalan (INN)
 Metacetamol (INN)
 Metaclazepam (INN)
 Metacycline (INN)
 Metadate
 Metaglip
 Metaglycodol (INN)
 Metahexamide (INN)
 Metahydrin
 Metalkonium chloride (INN)
 Metallibure (INN)
 Metamelfalan (INN)
 Metamfazone (INN)
 Metamfepramone (INN)
 Metamfetamine (INN)
 Metamizole (INN)
 Metampicillin (INN)

Metan-metaz 

 Metandienone (INN)
 Metandren
 Metanixin (INN)
 Metapramine (INN)
 Metaraminol (INN)
 Metastron
 Metatensin
 Metaterol (INN)
 Metaxalone (INN)
 Metazamide (INN)
 Metazide (INN)
 Metazocine (INN)

Metb-metf 

 Metbufen (INN)
 Metelimumab (INN)
 Meteneprost (INN)
 Metenolone (INN)
 Metergoline (INN)
 Metergotamine (INN)
 Metescufylline (INN)
 Metesculetol (INN)
 Metesind (INN)
 Metethoheptazine (INN)
 Metetoin (INN)
 Metformin (INN)

Meth

Metha-methd 

 methacholine chloride (INN)
 methadone (INN)
 Methadose
 methallenestril (INN)
 Methampex
 methamphetamine (USAN)
 methandriol (INN)
 methaniazide (INN)
 methanthelinium bromide (INN)
 methaphenilene (INN)
 methapyrilene (INN)
 methaqualone (INN)
 metharbital (INN)
 methastyridone (INN)
 methazolamide (INN)
 methcathinone
 methdilazine (INN)

Methe-methi 

 Methenamine (INN)
 Metheptazine (INN)
 Methergine
 Methestrol (INN)
 Methiodal sodium (INN)
 Methiomeprazine (INN)
 Methionine (INN)
 Methitural (INN)
 Methixene (INN)

Metho 

 Methocarbamol (INN)
 Methocidin (INN)
 Methohexital (INN)
 Methoprene (INN)
 Methopromazine (INN)
 Methosarb (Pharmacia & Upjohn Company)
 Methoserpidine (INN)
 Methotrexate (INN)
 Methotrexate (Lederle Laboratories)
 Methoxamine (INN)
 Methoxsalen (INN), also known as Oxsoralen
 Methoxyflurane (INN)
 Methoxyphedrine (INN)
 Methoxyphenamine (INN)

Methy 

 Methyclothiazide (INN)
 Methylbenactyzium bromide (INN)
 Methylbenzethonium chloride (INN)
 Methylcellulose (INN)
 Methylchromone (INN)
 Methyldesorphine (INN)
 Methyldihydromorphine (INN)
 Methyldopa (INN)
 Methylergometrine (INN)
 Methylin
 Methylnaltrexone (INN)
 Methylpentynol (INN)
 Methylphenidate (INN)
 Methylphenobarbital (INN)
 Methylprednisolone aceponate (INN)
 Methylprednisolone suleptanate (INN)
 Methylprednisolone (INN)
 Methylrosanilinium chloride (INN)
 Methyltestosterone (INN)
 Methylthioninium chloride (INN)
 Methylthiouracil (INN)
 Methyprylon (INN)
 Methysergide (INN)

Meti-metk 

 Meti-Derm
 Metiamide (INN)
 Metiapine (INN)
 Metiazinic acid (INN)
 Metibride (INN)
 Meticillin (INN)
 Meticortelone
 Meticorten
 Meticrane (INN)
 Metildigoxin (INN)
 Metimyd
 Metindizate (INN)
 Metioprim (INN)
 Metioxate (INN)
 Metipirox (INN)
 Metipranolol (INN)
 Metiprenaline (INN)
 Metirosine (INN)
 Metisazone (INN)
 Metitepine (INN)
 Metixene (INN)
 Metizoline (INN)
 Metkefamide (INN)

Meto 

 Metochalcone (INN)
 Metocinium iodide (INN)
 Metoclopramide (INN)
 Metofenazate (INN)
 Metofoline (INN)
 Metogest (INN)
 Metohexal (Hexal Australia) [Au]. Redirects to metoprolol.
 Metolazone (INN)
 Metomidate (INN)
 Metopimazine (INN)
 Metopirone
 Metopon (INN)
 Metoprolol (INN)
 Metoquizine (INN)
 Metoserpate (INN)
 Metostilenol (INN)
 Metoxepin (INN)

Metr-mety 

 Metra. Redirects to phentermine
 Metrafazoline (INN)
 Metralindole (INN)
 Metrazifone (INN)
 Metreleptin (USAN)
 Metrenperone (INN)
 Metreton
 Metribolone (INN)
 Metrifonate (INN)
 Metrifudil (INN)
 Metrizamide (INN)
 Metro I.V.
 Metrocream
 Metrodin
 Metrogel (3M) redirects to metronidazole
 Metrolotion
 Metromidol
 Metronidazole (INN)
 Metubine Iodide
 Meturedepa (INN)
 Metynodiol (INN)
 Metyrapone (INN)
 Metyridine (INN)